Fulbright College or Fulbright School may refer to:

J. William Fulbright College of Arts and Sciences, at the University of Arkansas
Fulbright University Vietnam, in Ho Chi Minh City

See also
 Fulbright University Vietnam